The 2010 Southern Illinois Salukis football team represented Southern Illinois University Carbondale as a member of the Missouri Valley Football Conference (MVFC) during the 2010 NCAA Division I FCS football season. Led by third-year head coach Dale Lennon, the Salukis compiled an overall record of 5–6 with a mark of 4–4 in conference play, placing in a six-way tie for third in the MVFC. Southern Illinois played home games at the newly-opened Saluki Stadium in Carbondale, Illinois.

Schedule

References

Southern Illinois
Southern Illinois Salukis football seasons
Southern Illinois Salukis football